The Government of Gilgit-Baltistan is the government of the administrative territory of Gilgit-Baltistan, Pakistan. Its powers and structure are set out in the 2009 Gilgit-Baltistan Empowerment and Self-Governance Order, in which 14 districts come under its authority and jurisdiction. The government includes the cabinet, selected from members the Gilgit–Baltistan Assembly, and the non-political civil staff within each department. The province is governed by a unicameral legislature with the head of government known as the Chief Minister. The Chief Minister, invariably the leader of a political party represented in the Assembly, selects members of the Cabinet. The Chief Minister and Cabinet are thus responsible the functioning of government and are entitled to remain in office so long as it maintains the confidence of the elected Assembly. The head of state of the province is known as the Governor. The terms Government of Gilgit–Baltistan or Gilgit–Baltistan Government are often used in official documents. The seat of government is in Gilgit, thus serving as the capital of the territory.

History
In 1970, the Gilgit Agency, the Baltistan district of erstwhile Ladakh wazarat, and the hill states of Hunza and Nagar were amalgamated to form the Federally Administered Northern Areas or Northern Areas for short. The territory was renamed Gilgit-Baltistan in 2007 and given self-government status in 2009.

Gilgit-Baltistan Empowerment and Self-Governance Order 2009 
While administratively controlled by Pakistan since 1947, Gilgit-Baltistan has not yet been formally integrated into the Pakistani federation state and does not participate in constitutional political affairs. On 29 August 2009, the Gilgit-Baltistan Empowerment and Self-Governance Order 2009 was passed by the Government of Pakistan and later signed by the President. The order granted self-rule to the people of Gilgit-Baltistan, by creating, among other things, an elected Gilgit-Baltistan Legislative Assembly and a Gilgit-Baltistan Council. Gilgit-Baltistan thus gained de facto province-like status without constitutionally becoming part of Pakistan.

The 26th Amendment for the Provisional Provincial status 
In November 2020, Pakistani prime minister Imran Khan announced that Gilgit-Baltistan would attain provisional provincial status after the 2020 Gilgit-Baltistan Assembly election. 

The Law Ministry of Pakistan recently finalised the draft of the 26th Amendment to the Constitution, submitting it to the prime minister for review. The proposed legislation is aimed at awarding GB provisional provincial status, and is expected to be presented in parliament for debate. If passed by a two-thirds majority in parliament, Gilgit-Baltistan would likely be given the status of province through an amendment in Article 1 of the Constitution. The 26th Amendment would empower Gilgit-Baltistan as per the other provinces of the Pakistan without jeopardizing Pakistan's stance about the Kashmir conflict.

As of now the work on the legislation about the provisional provincial status has been slowed down due to the recent political unrest in Pakistan.

Executive 
The government of Gilgit Baltistan consists of democratically elected body with the Governor of Gilgit-Baltistan as the constitutional head. The Chief Minister of Gilgit-Baltistan is elected by the Provincial Assembly of the Gilgit-Baltistan to serve as the head of the provincial government in Gilgit-Baltistan. Whereas, the Chief Secretary Gilgit-Baltistan is usually an officer of grade BPS-21 or 22 from the Pakistan Administrative Service acts as an administrative head of the Gilgit-Baltistan.

Departments 

The Executive Consists of the following departments. Each or two of these departments mix up to form a Ministry. Each of the ministry is headed by the elected minister or a technocrat appointed by the Chief Minister of Gilgit-Baltistan and a provincial secretary of BPS-20 grade officer of the Pakistan Administrative Service.
 Home & Prisons Department
 Finance Department
 Law and Prosecution Department
 Services and General Administration, Information and Cabinet Department
 Revenue, Usher and Zakat, Excise and Taxation and Cooperative Department
 Food and Agriculture, Fisheries and Animal Husbandry Department
 Forest, Wildlife and Environment Department
 Education, Social Welfare and Women Development
 Health and Population Welfare Department
 Works Department
 Local Government, Rural Development and Census Department
 Water and Power Department
 Tourism, Sports, Culture and Youth Department
 Mineral Development, Industries, Commerce & Labour Department
 Planning and Development Department

Cabinet

Legislature 

The Gilgit-Baltistan Legislative Assembly is a 33-seat unicameral legislative body. It has 24 directly elected members, 6 reserved seats are for women plus 3 seats are reserved for technocrats. Current Assembly of Gilgit-Baltistan is the third successive Assembly of the region that came into being as a result of the of the November 2020 Gilgit-Baltistan Assembly election. In the third Assembly of Gilgit-Baltistan PTI occupies 22 seats out of 33, enough for making a strong government.

Since the proclaimation Gilgit-Baltistan Empowerment and Self Governance Order there were two assemblies that successfully completed their constitutional tenures. First Assembly lasted from 2009 to 2015 in which PPP was in power. The Second Gilgit Baltistan Assembly lasted from 2015 to 2020 in which PMLN government was in power.

Gilgit-Baltistan Council 

The Gilgit-Baltistan Council has been established as per Article 33 of Gilgit-Baltistan (Empowerment & Self Governance) Order, 2009. Its Chairman is the Prime Minister of Pakistan and Governor of Gilgit-Baltistan is the Vice-Chairman. It can legislate on 53 subjects as provided in Schedule III of the Order.
Other members include Chief Minister of Gilgit-Baltistan, 6 members are nominated by Prime Minister of Pakistan and 6 members are elected by Gilgit-Baltistan Legislative Assembly.

Judiciary 
In light of a verdict by Supreme Court of Pakistan in the case filed by Wahab Al Kahiri, Justice Shehbaz Khan and others through Al-Jehad Trust Versus Federation of Pakistan, as per orders of Supreme Court of Pakistan, Government of Pakistan established Northern Areas Court of Appeals at Gilgit vide Gazette of Pakistan, extraordinary, part II dated 8 November 1999 with Appellate Jurisdiction, The Court started function on 27 September 2005, when the Chairman and members were appointed. on 15 December 2007 by virtue of amendments in the Northern Areas Governance order 1994, the nomenclature of the Court was re-designated as Northern Areas Supreme Appellate Court and its jurisdiction was also enlarged by conferring Original and Appellate jurisdiction, It was also given the Status equal to the Supreme Court of Azad Jammu and Kashmir.

Supreme Appellate Court Gilgit-Baltistan 

On 9 September 2009, the Supreme Appellate Court was conferred the similar jurisdiction equal to the Supreme Court of Pakistan by promulgating Gilgit-Baltistan (Empowerment and Self Governance Order) 2009. The Supreme Appellate Court is consisting of a Chief Judge and two Judges. The Permanent Seat of the Court is at Gilgit, but the Court also sits from time to time at Skardu Branch Registry.

Gilgit-Baltistan Chief Court 

Gilgit-Baltistan Chief Court is the court of appeal and is equivalent to other provincial high courts according to  Gilgit-Baltistan Empowerment and Self-Governance Order 2009.

See also 
 Governor of Gilgit-Baltistan
 Chief Minister of Gilgit-Baltistan
 Gilgit-Baltistan Legislative Assembly
 Gilgit-Baltistan Council

References

External links
 Government of Gilgit Baltistan

 
Provincial Governments of Pakistan